Doratopteryx flavomaculata is a moth in the Himantopteridae family. It was described by Hering in 1937. It is found in the Democratic Republic of the Congo (West Kasai).

References

Moths described in 1937
Himantopteridae